Lillian Marie Disney ( Bounds; February 15, 1899December 16, 1997) was an American ink artist at the Disney Studios and the wife of Walt Disney from 1925 until his death in 1966. Born in Spalding, Idaho, Disney graduated from high school in Lapwai before moving to Lewiston to attend college. She left Idaho in 1923 to move to southern California, where she would meet future husband Walt while working as a secretary at Walt Disney Animation Studios.

Lillian and Walt married on July 13, 1925, and had two daughters, Diane Marie Disney (1933–2013), their only biological child, and Sharon Mae Disney (1936–1993), who was adopted. Lillian and Walt had ten grandchildren, including seven by Diane and three by Sharon. During a train ride in 1928, Walt revealed to his wife a new animated character, whom he called "Mortimer Mouse". Lillian suggested that he rename his character "Mickey Mouse", a name which has since become synonymous with the Disney brand.

Walt Disney died from lung cancer on December 15, 1966, after which Lillian remarried John L. Truyens (a Southern California real estate developer) from 1969 until his death in 1981. On December 15, 1997, Lillian Disney suffered a stroke and died the following morning in Los Angeles at age 98.

Early years 
Born Lillian Marie Bounds in Spalding, Idaho, she grew up in nearby Lapwai on the Nez Perce Indian Reservation, where her father Willard worked as a blacksmith and federal marshal. She was the youngest of ten children, and the family struggled financially; her father died when she was seventeen. After graduation from Lapwai High School, Bounds and her mother moved down to Lewiston; she attended a year of business college then moved to southern California in 1923 to live with her sister  She was working at the Disney Studio in "ink and paint" as a secretary when she met Walt.

Marriage to Walt Disney 
Lillian Bounds and Walt Disney married on July 13, 1925, in Idaho at her brother's home. The wedding was officiated by the rector of Lewiston's Episcopal Church of the Nativity. Walt Disney's parents did not attend. As Bounds's father was deceased, her uncle, who was chief of the Lewiston Fire Department, gave the bride away. She wore a dress that she had made herself. The couple had two daughters, Diane Marie Disney  and Sharon Mae Disney  the latter of whom was adopted. Disney had ten grandchildren: seven by Diane and her husband (Ron W. Miller), and three by Sharon and her two husbands, Robert Brown and William Lund.

Recognition 

Her film career includes work as an ink artist on the film Plane Crazy.  Disney is credited with having named her husband's most famous character, Mickey Mouse, during a train trip from New York to California in 1928. Walt showed a drawing of the cartoon mouse to his wife and told her that he was going to name it "Mortimer Mouse".  Lillian replied that the name sounded "too depressing" and she was very proud to have suggested the name "Mickey Mouse" instead of Mortimer.

At the Carolwood Pacific Railroad, Walt Disney named his 1:8-scale live steam locomotive the "Lilly Belle" in his wife's honor. Additionally, Walt named one of the Disneyland Railroad cars the "Lilly Belle" in her honor, and the Walt Disney World Railroad has a locomotive named "Lilly Belle", where each locomotive is named for someone who greatly contributed to the Walt Disney Company. Walt Disney Imagineering created "The Empress Lilly", a paddle steamer replica, at Walt Disney World in Disney Springs and Disney christened it on May 1, 1977.  Disney was inducted into the Disney Legends in 2003.

Later years and death 
Walt Disney died of lung cancer on December 15, 1966, aged 65, and Lillian was married to John L. Truyens from May 1969 until his death on February 24, 1981, aged 73.

In 1987, she pledged a $50 million gift towards the construction of a new concert hall in Los Angeles. After several delays, the Walt Disney Concert Hall opened in 2003, six years after her death. She also helped fund the founding of The California Institute of the Arts.

In the 1990s, reflecting on her 41-year marriage to Walt Disney, she said, "We shared a wonderful, exciting life, and we loved every minute of it. He was a wonderful husband to me, and wonderful and joyful father and grandfather."

Disney suffered a stroke on December 15, 1997, which was exactly 31 years after the death of her first husband, Walt. She died the following morning at her home in West Los Angeles at the age of 98. She was interred at Forest Lawn Memorial Park in Glendale, California.

References

External links 

1899 births
1997 deaths
American philanthropists
People from Greater Los Angeles
People from Nez Perce County, Idaho
Philanthropists from California
Lillian
People from Lapwai, Idaho

fr:Famille Disney#Lillian Marie Bounds
Burials at Forest Lawn Memorial Park (Glendale)
Walt Disney Animation Studios people